Kara Kara was an electoral district of the Legislative Assembly in the Australian state of Victoria from 1877 to 1927 and 1955 to 1976. It was based in north-western Victoria and included the subdivisions of Donald, Charlton, Minyip, Murtoa, St. Arnaud, Wedderburn, Inglewood, Dunnolly, Landsborough, Avoca, Maryborough and Carisbrook. It was abolished in 1976 and replaced by the electoral district of Ripon.

Members for Kara Kara

Kara Kara was abolished in 1927, the Electoral district of Kara Kara and Borung was created 1927 and existed until 1945. Pennington was member for Kara Kara and Borung from 1927 to 1935.

      # = by-election

Election results

References

Former electoral districts of Victoria (Australia)
1877 establishments in Australia
1927 disestablishments in Australia
1955 establishments in Australia
1976 disestablishments in Australia